Latif Čičić (born 10 July 1943) is a former professional footballer and coach.

Career
Born in Prijepolje, Čičić began playing in a club near his hometown FAP youth team. After two years in youth team he started playing in senior football team of FAP for one year. He then joined Sloga Kraljevo in 1964 and played for them four years in the Yugoslav Second League. In 1968, he moves to one of the biggest clubs in Yugoslavia, Partizan where he stayed for one season and made 44 appearances for the club in total. In 1969, Čičić returns in Sloga Kraljevo and plays four more years in the club. Then in 1973, he moved abroad and joined West German club SV Alsenborn, that was in the 1970s attempting to win promotion in the Bundesliga one of the top football leagues in Europe. Where he played five years. Then became a coach and ended his professional football career at SV Alsenborn, West Germany in 1978.

Style of play
Čičić was a defender. He mostly played as a right back, but towards the end of his professional football career he also played as a centre-back.

References

External links
 
 

1943 births
Living people
People from Prijepolje
Association football defenders
Yugoslav footballers
FK Partizan players
FK Sloga Kraljevo players
FK FAP players